Stigmaphyllon eggersii is a species of plant in the Malpighiaceae family. It is a vine endemic to Ecuador.  Its natural habitat is subtropical or tropical dry forests.

References

eggersii
Endemic flora of Ecuador
Endangered flora of South America
Taxonomy articles created by Polbot